Otunba Dipo Dina International Stadium, formerly the Gateway Stadium, is a multi-use stadium in Ijebu-Ode, Nigeria.  It is currently used mostly for football matches and is the home ground for FC Ebedei.  The stadium has a capacity of 20,000 people. It was renovated for the 2009 FIFA U-17 World Cup.

The stadium was renamed in 2011 after Otunba Dipo Dina, an assassinated political candidate.

Photo gallery

Notable football competitions

1998 African Women's Championship

2009 FIFA U-17 World Cup

References

External links
Ijebu-Ode Stadium will shock FIFA – Daniel 

Football venues in Nigeria
Ogun State
Buildings and structures in Ogun State